Falcke is a German surname from the German word Falke for falcon. Notable people with the surname include:

 George Falcke (1891–1979), Danish gymnast
 Heino Falcke (born 1966), German astrophysicist
 Martin Müller-Falcke (born 1972), German rower

German-language surnames
Surnames from nicknames